Sir Philip Parker, 1st Baronet (c. 1625 – March 1690), was an English politician who sat in the House of Commons between 1679 and 1687.

Parker was the son of Sir Philip Parker of Erwarton and his wife Dorothy Gawdy, daughter of Sir Robert Gawdy of Claxton, Norfolk.

Parker was created a Baronet of Arwarton in the County of Suffolk, on 16 July 1661. He was Member of Parliament for Harwich from 1679 to 1685. and for Sandwich from 1685 to 1687.

Parker married Rebecca Long, daughter of Sir Walter Long, 1st Baronet, on 9 April 1649. They had three sons and four daughters. these included
 Sir Philip Parker, 2nd Baronet (c. 1650–c. 1698), who succeeded him in 1690
 Calthorpe Long (1657–1729)

He married secondly Hannah Bedingfield, widow of Sir Thomas Bedingfield and daughter of Philip Bacon of Wolverstone.

References 

1690 deaths
Baronets in the Baronetage of England
English MPs 1680–1681
Year of birth uncertain
English MPs 1681
English MPs 1685–1687